Layer de la Haye (often spelled Layer-de-la-Haye; locally known just as Layer) is a small village of around 2,000 people, measured at 1,767 in the 2011 Census, near Colchester in Essex, England.

History 
The village is thought to have been founded in Saxon times, with its original name, Legra, meaning 'lookout'. Its elevation made it an ideal vantage point for the Saxons against raiding parties from the coast. Later its name changed to Leire or Leger, meaning 'mud'. A Norse word, this is likely to have referred to the soil and marshland around the village. During the time of the Norman Conquests, the village was "owned" by the de la Hayes, and its name thus changed to Layer de la Haye. Layer was ravaged by the Black Plague of the 14th Century. The Church became derelict until it was restored by monks.

In 1289, John de Rye donated 160 acres (650,000 m2) of land to St John's Abbey in Colchester. As a token of appreciation, a manor and farm were named after him (Rye Manor and Rye Farm respectively). At the end of the 15th century, the Abbey built a toll-gate house, now called the Greate House (originally the Gate House) near Malting Green.

At the time of the dissolution of the Monasteries which began in 1536, Sir Thomas Audley, who in turn became speaker of the House of Commons and Lord Chancellor, appropriated the manors of Rye and Blind Knights, together with the Mill and the patronage of the benefice. Layer Mill is mentioned in the Domesday Book as a water-mill. The mill wheel was powered by water from the Roman River.

Within the churchyard of St John the Baptist lie the graves of Arthur Cecil Alport (a South African physician who first identified the Alport syndrome in a British family in 1927), Cuthbert Alport (a Conservative Party politician, minister and life peer) and General Sir Ivo Vesey (a British Army officer who served as Chief of the General Staff in India from 1937 to 1939).

Layer de la Haye is among the villages which suffered damage from the 1884 Colchester earthquake.

Population 
In 1950 its population was under 700; by 1975 it was over 1,000 and in 1990 it was just short of 2,000. However, the proximity of Colchester, with its large range of shops and facilities, eventually forced all of the three shops in Layer to close. The Layer Village Store was reopened by new owners in 2015.

Despite concerns over vandalism and anti-social behaviour, the village is generally regarded as a safe and happy place to be. Societies and clubs provide entertainment for the whole village community.

House Prices
Layer-De-La-Haye, with an overall average price of £444,714 was more expensive than nearby Lexden (£371,319), Stanway (£309,215) and Colchester (£273,543).

See also
Village Website

References

External links

Villages in Essex
Borough of Colchester